James Leon Wilson (born July 30, 1986) is a former American football safety. He was drafted by the Miami Dolphins in the seventh round of the 2011 NFL Draft. He played college football at Montana.

Professional career

Miami Dolphins

Wilson was selected in the seventh round (235th overall) in the 2011 NFL Draft by the Miami Dolphins. On September 25, 2011, Wilson recorded his first-career interception from Colt McCoy and the Cleveland Browns. On October 17, 2011, Wilson recorded his first-career forced fumble against Joe McKnight and the New York Jets. Wilson ended the 2011 season with 8 sacks, 5 passes defended, an interception, and a forced fumble.

On October 14, 2012, Wilson recorded his second-career forced fumble against Brit Miller and the St. Louis Rams. On October 28, 2012, Wilson recorded his first-career sack against Mark Sanchez and the New York Jets. Wilson also blocked a punt for a touchdown against Robert Malone in the same game. On November 11, 2012, Wilson recorded his second-career sack on Jake Locker against the Tennessee Titans. Wilson ended the 2012 season with 35 tackles, 4 passes defended, a forced fumble and a career-high 2 sacks.

On September 22, 2013, Wilson grabbed his 2nd interception off Matt Ryan and the Atlanta Falcons. On September 30, 2013, Wilson recorded his 3rd forced fumble off Darren Sproles and the New Orleans Saints. On November 11, 2013, Wilson took his 3rd interception off Mike Glennon and the Tampa Bay Buccaneers. Wilson ended the 2013 season with 37 tackles, 5 passes defended, a forced fumble and a career-high 2 interceptions.

On September 28, 2014, Wilson recorded his 4th interception off Matt McGloin and the Oakland Raiders. Wilson ended the 2014 season with a career-high 57 tackles, 2 passes defended, and an interception.

San Diego Chargers
On March 13, 2015, Wilson signed a two-year, $4.85 million contract with the San Diego Chargers. On September 20, 2015, Wilson recorded his first-career fumble recovery off Jeremy Hill and the Cincinnati Bengals. On October 12, 2015, Wilson caught his 5th interception from Michael Vick and the Pittsburgh Steelers. On November 29, 2015, Wilson recorded his 3rd-career sack off Blake Bortles and the Jacksonville Jaguars. On December 15, 2015, Wilson was released by the Chargers.

Kansas City Chiefs
On April 1, 2016, Wilson signed a one-year contract with the Kansas City Chiefs. The Chiefs released Wilson on May 3, 2016.

Cincinnati Bengals 
On July 28, 2016, Wilson signed with the Cincinnati Bengals.  On September 2, 2016, Wilson was released by the Bengals.

Personal life
On June 2, 2007, Wilson was accused of shooting and killing the boyfriend of his aunt, 29-year-old Kevin Smoot of Lancaster, California. Wilson was subsequently arrested on June 12, 2007, on murder charges by the State of California. Two murder trials were held, in the first trial the jury was unable to reach a verdict after a week of deliberation, and the second trial ended on July 9, 2009, in an acquittal by the jury as his attorney argued Wilson acted in self-defense during the altercation.

References

External links

Montana Grizzlies football bio
Miami Dolphins bio
San Diego Chargers bio

1986 births
Living people
Players of American football from San Diego
African-American players of American football
American football cornerbacks
American football safeties
Montana Grizzlies football players
Miami Dolphins players
San Diego Chargers players
Kansas City Chiefs players
Cincinnati Bengals players
21st-century African-American sportspeople
20th-century African-American people